Yvonne Shortt (born December 5, 1972, in Queens, New York) is  a visually impaired African American social practice installation artist. Her work encompasses illustration, installation, sculpture, and photography. Shortt's work has been shown in museums and public parks throughout New York City, and deals with various themes, including equality, disability, community, and race. According to a New York Times documentary short that featured her, she left her previous career and chose to focus on the arts after being diagnosed with retinitis pigmentosa.

Education 
Shortt holds a Master of Science - MS, Mathematics from New York University.

Work

Museum For Contemporary Artists
In 2022, Shortt established a new kind of museum framework.  The framework consisted of each artist being their own museum.  Each artist creates a map entry so people all over the world can find them, register their collection online, and have their own visiting hours.  In this way the artist is hoping to take back the term museum for the artist.

Elmhurst Sculpture Garden 
In 2017, Shortt established the Elmhurst Sculpture Garden in an abandoned parking lot in Elmhurst, Queens, New York with the help of local community volunteers and artists. With additional funding by the Burning Man Global Arts Grant in 2017 and the National Endowment of the Arts Grant in 2018, the community garden was able to expand in area space. Under Shortt's leadership, the garden serves as an arts incubator for artists to exhibit their pieces, as well as receive guidance in obtaining grants to revitalize public spaces in their communities.

African American Marbleization 
An Act of Civil disobedience dating back to 2016, African American Marbleization is a series of guerrilla sculptures by Yvonne Shortt. It is the artist's response to oppression and racisms of African Americans in art, history, and her country. The pieces are cast in marble dust and installed outdoors as installations or small sculptures. The fragment pieces are installed on underpasses or other cement structures while the busts are often coupled with natural materials like water, wood, and the earth.

Artistic Response to A.I.R. Gallery 
Yvonne Shortt became a member of A.I.R. Gallery in January, 2021. Soon after in 2021, Ms. Shortt Co-found A.I.R. Gallery's Research and Development Committee with Daria Dorosh, founding member of A.I.R. Gallery. The committee seeks to make, model, and introduce new frameworks for artists; allowing artists to disrupt the scarcity mindset and patriarchal systems commonly encountered in the art world.

Ms. Shortt began working on an artistic response project that speaks to the personal difficulties experienced as an African American woman at A.I.R. Gallery. The encompassing goal, to seek honest communication and respect. A series of works produced for the artistic response make use of materials such as varying types of rope, cotton, wood branches.

Public art

Peppermint Pieces and Waking Blind 
In 2018, Shortt produced two pieces inspired by her retinitis pigmentosa condition. She was selected to display one of her outdoor art installation pieces, Peppermint Pieces, as part of the Art in the Parks: Active Open Space initiative, which is funded by the Public Health in New York, Inc. on behalf of the New York City Department of Health and Mental Hygiene, in partnership with the City of New York Parks and Recreation. Peppermint Pieces is a multimedia piece made of wood and aluminum on display in Captain Tilly Park in Jamaica. Shortt's cement sculpture piece, Waking Blind, is also inspired by the artist's eye condition, which is displayed in Elmhurst Sculpture Garden.

Pavillion Landing
Shortt was among the recipients of the Art in the Parks: Alliance for Flushing Meadows Corona Park 2019 Grant to create an art installation that follows the theme, Flushing Meadows Corona Park: A Park for the Future. Inspired by the 1964-65 New York World's Fair, Shortt created the sculpture piece, Pavillion Landing, with the aid of park goers and community members during several collaborative sculpting sessions at the park. The piece, which features stranded intergalactic children, is on display at the David Dinkins Circle in Flushing Meadows–Corona Park.

Rigged?
In 2018, Friends of MacDonald Park in Forest Hills commissioned Shortt to create an outdoor piece that addressed the political, social, and economic systems in the United States, which resulted in the creation of the piece Rigged?. The maze structure, with its accompanying cement rabbits and carrots, is continuously updated depending on the general public's feedback about the piece.

Women Who Build - Artists Who Own
In 2016, Shortt led an investigative project that analyzed the role of women, or the lack thereof, in the construction industry. With funding provided by the Awesome Foundation, the Queens Council on the Arts, and Culture Push, with additional support from the Eileen Fisher Activating Leadership Grant, Shortt separated the project in two phases. The first phase involved a construction workshop series, where over 100 women were taught basic construction skills and equipment handling. The first phase concluded with the creation of a tiny house on wheels, which is now used as a tea and zen garden.

In the second phase, Shortt commissioned 13 artists so that they can create various interactive installations that prompted community engagement and conversation over the housing crisis in New York City. Among the installations include performing art pieces, participatory embroidery, photography, and more. All installations were then photographed and documented in the exhibition Dwelling at the Queens Museum.

RPGA Studio, Inc. 
In 2009, Shortt established Rego Park Green Alliance, an art organization that addressed community awareness of several important issues affecting the communities of Forest Hills, Kew Gardens, Rego Park, and other surrounding neighborhoods in Queens. RPGA Studio, Inc. gained a nonprofit status in 2015, and has been a recipient of various grants, awards, and partnerships, including the Citizens Committee for New York City Grants, Burning Man Global Arts Grant, National Endowment for the Arts Grant, and others.

References

External links
Official website
RPGA Studio official site

1972 births
Living people
African-American contemporary artists
American contemporary artists
American installation artists
African-American women artists
Sculptors from New York (state)
20th-century American women artists
21st-century American women artists
African-American sculptors
20th-century African-American women
20th-century African-American people
20th-century African-American artists
21st-century African-American women
21st-century African-American artists